The Tasbih of Fatimah, commonly known as "Tasbih Hadhrat Zahra" or "Tasbih al-Zahra", is a special kind of Dhikr which is attributed to Fatimah bint Muhammad, and consists of saying 33 repetitions of subḥāna -llah, meaning "Glorified is God"; 33 repetitions of al-ḥamdu lillāh, meaning "Praise be to God"; 33 or 34 (depending on the hadith) repetitions of ʾallāhu ʾakbar (ٱللَّٰهُ أَكْبَرُ), meaning "God is Greater [than everything]".

According to an Islamic narration from Ali ibn Abi Talib, the Islamic prophet Muhammad taught this dhikr (Tasbih of Fatimah) to his daughter Fatimah. According to this narration Fatimah, who was tired due to daily routine, intended to ask her father for a servant to perform chores. Her father (Muhammad) heard of what she had to say, and so he went to her house, and sat with her, then said, "May I not direct you to something better than what you have asked for?" He then taught her the mentioned tasbih, and said that it would be better for them than a servant; hence Fatimah was pleased with it.

In regards to this tasbih which is also famous as Tasbihat al-Sayyidah al-Zahra or Tasbihat Hazrat Fatimah al-Zahra,
it is said that this is Mustahab (recommended) to say tasbih of Fatimah after every (Wajib/Mustahabb) prayers; it is also emphasized Mustahab to say this dhikr after Fajr prayer.

Manner of recitation

Hadith

It has been narrated from Muhammad al-Baqir that he said: "Allah has not been worshiped by anything better than tasbih Hazrat Zahra—from the aspect of praise and dhikr; Allah would grant it to Fatimah if there was/is a better practice rather than this tasbih."

Ja'far al-Sadiq said: "Reciting Tasbeeh of Hazrat Zahra (s.a.) everyday after every Salat is liked by me more than reciting one thousand rakats of (mustahab) namaz." Moreover, Imam Muhammad al-Baqir (as) mentioned that: "One who recites the Tasbeeh of Hazrat Zahra (s.a.) and then seeks forgiveness, will be forgiven."

See also

Salawat
Book of Fatimah
Ahl al-Bayt
The Twelve Imams
The Fourteen Infallibles
Genealogy of Khadijah's daughters
Sermon of Fadak given by Fatimah
Bayt al-Ahzan

References

External links
 'Tasbih' of Syeda Fatema Zehra

Fatimah
Salah terminology
Islamic terminology
Arabic words and phrases
Arabic words and phrases in Sharia
Shia Islam
Prayer beads